This article lists the fatal accidents that happened in the Suzuka Circuit, a motorsport race track that is operated by Mobilityland, a subsidiary of Honda Motor Co., Ltd., located in Suzuka City in the Mie Prefecture of Japan. Twelve have involved cars, including one involving the safety car, and seven have involved motorcycles. Seventeen people have died in accidents at the track during its half-century of existence, almost all of them Japanese professional racers, with the exceptions of American safety car driver Elmo Langley and French driver Jules Bianchi.

Deaths at the track have included that of Honda RC211V racer Daijiro Kato on April 20, 2003, after the Japanese motorcycle Grand Prix race. He died of a brain stem infarction after spending two weeks in a coma. Dome Karasu driver Tojiro Ukiya died in a test run on August 20, 1965, Lola T92/50 (with Mugen Honda engine) racer Hitoshi Ogawa on May 24, 1992, while on the way to the hospital immediately after the Japanese Formula 3000 race; and American, NASCAR safety car driver Elmo Langley died on November 21, 1996.  Langley suffered a heart attack while driving the safety car.

The most recent death to have happened at the track is that of Jules Bianchi on October 5, 2014, who collided with a crane tractor that was deployed to pick up Adrian Sutil's car, which had spun out earlier. Bianchi succumbed to his injuries on July 17, 2015 following a nine-month coma, making him the first non-Japanese driver to die on the track in a crash.

List of fatal accidents involving competitors

Sources

Suzuka